Heleia is a genus of birds in the white-eye family Zosteropidae. One species, the spot-breasted heleia is restricted to the island of Timor. The pygmy white-eye is endemic to the island of Borneo. The thick-billed heleia, occurs on Flores and Sumbawa.

The genus Heleia was introduced in 1865 by the German ornithologist Gustav Hartlaub to accommodate the spot-breasted heleia. The name is from Ancient Greek eleia, an unidentified small bird mentioned by the Greek scholar Callimachus. 

The genus contains ten species:

Mees's white-eye (Heleia javanica)
Grey-hooded white-eye (Heleia pinaiae)
Pygmy white-eye (Heleia squamifrons)
Mindanao white-eye (Heleia goodfellowi)
Streak-headed white-eye (Heleia squamiceps)
Cream-browed white-eye (Heleia superciliaris)
Crested white-eye (Heleia dohertyi)
Spot-breasted heleia (Heleia muelleri)
Thick-billed heleia (Heleia crassirostris)
Yellow-ringed white-eye (Heleia wallacei)

References

 
Bird genera
Taxonomy articles created by Polbot